Square Deal is a British sitcom created by Richard Ommanney which ran for two series between 3 September 1988 and 13 October 1989 on ITV. The series starring Lise-Ann McLaughlin and Tim Bentinck as Nigel and Emma Barrington, a yuppie couple whose apparently comfortable lifestyle is brusquely shaken by the arrival on the scene of Sean, an incurable and impoverished young romantic. It was produced by London Weekend Television.

Sean Hooper (Brett Fancy) is a determined dreamer who has set himself until his next birthday – eight weeks hence – to make a success of his life; he then bumps into Emma – literally, they have an accident from which he ends up in plaster – and they agree to go into business together, buying a café/sandwich bar. The enterprise will benefit from a perfect blend of their talents: her business knowledge and his acumen as a sandwich-maker – hitherto, he has been selling them to a market stall to support his career as a writer.

With Sean on the scene, Nigel and Emma's relationship rapidly deteriorates, and a love triangle emerges, first in Nigel's mind and then in reality, as Emma realises that, for all his quirks, Sean is more fun to be with than her husband. An estate agent with a cunning mind, Nigel proceeds to wreck his wife's café plans by gazumping her, and talk of a divorce is soon in the air. Later (in the second series) Sean turns his attentions to rock singing, becoming a fledgling star, while Nigel becomes Sean's landlord and develops an interest in his new neighbour, Geraldine (Georgina Melville).

Cast
 Lise-Ann McLaughlin – Emma Barrington 
 Tim Bentinck – Nigel Barrington 
 Brett Fancy – Sean Hooper
 Angus Barnett – Alan 
 Jeremy Sinden – Max Grout 
 Jo McEvoy – Sally 
 Beth Porter – Hannah (series 1)
 Frank Ellis – Brian (series 2)
 Georgina Melville – Geraldine Gunter-Forbes (series 2)
 Anthony Daniels – Julian Pickford

Episode list

Series 1

Series 2

References

External links

Square Deal at the Phill.co.uk Comedy Guide

1988 British television series debuts
1989 British television series endings
1980s British sitcoms
English-language television shows
ITV sitcoms
London Weekend Television shows
Television series by ITV Studios
Television shows set in London